Ivona Dadic (born 29 December 1993) is an Austrian track and field athlete of Bosnian descent. She competed at the 2012 Summer Olympics in the women's heptathlon event. At the 2020 Summer Olympics she finished 8th.

Early life and career

Ivona Dadić was born on 29 December 1993 in Wels, Austria to Nine and Danica Dadić, who are from Bugojno, Bosnia and Herzegovina. Dadić was raised as a Roman Catholic.
At the age of nine she won her first competition. Her brother Ivan died in 2008 in car accident so she has a tattooed cross on her left hand with his name. In 2015 Dadić won a bronze medal at the 2015 European U23 Championships with 6033 points. One year later she won a bronze medal at the 2016 Amsterdam with 6408 points.

Dadić competed at the 2012 Olympic Games in London. She achieved three personal bests—in long jump, javelin, and the 800 meter—finishing 25th overall.

Awards
Večernjakova domovnica (Večernji list) - Best Sportswoman in Croatian diaspora

Competition record

Personal bests
Outdoor
200 m: 23.69 (July 2017)
800 m: 2:10.67 (May 2012)
100 m hurdles: 13.83 (July 2016)
High jump: 1.83 (July 2017)
Long jump: 6.49 (June 2016)
Shot put: 14.44 (July 2017)
Javelin throw: 52.48 (September 2015)
Heptathlon: 6408 (July 2016) NR
Indoor
800 m: 2:13.15 (February 2018)
60 m hurdles: 8.32 (March 2018)
High jump: 1.87 (March 2017)
Long jump: 6.41 (March 2017)
Shot put: 14.27 (March 2018)
Pentathlon: 4767 (March 2017) NR

References

External links

Living people
Austrian heptathletes
Olympic athletes of Austria
Athletes (track and field) at the 2012 Summer Olympics
Athletes (track and field) at the 2016 Summer Olympics
Athletes (track and field) at the 2010 Summer Youth Olympics
Austrian people of Croatian descent
Austrian people of Bosnia and Herzegovina descent
Croats of Bosnia and Herzegovina
Austrian female athletes
1993 births
European Athletics Championships medalists
People from Wels
Sportspeople from Upper Austria
Athletes (track and field) at the 2020 Summer Olympics